"Tonight" is a song written by David Bowie and Iggy Pop for the latter's second solo studio album, Lust for Life (1977). The song was later made into the title-track for Bowie's own album Tonight (1984).

David Bowie version 

Bowie covered the song with guest singer Tina Turner in 1984 for his sixteenth studio album of the same name. One of three Iggy Pop covers on the album, it was recorded as a duet with Turner, but the single release was only credited to Bowie. The original spoken-word introduction to the 1977 version, establishing that the lyric is addressed to a lover dying of a heroin overdose, was excised from Bowie's version because Bowie regarded it as an "idiosyncrasy" of Iggy Pop that did not match his own personal vocabulary. Bowie also stated that he didn't want to "inflict" that part of the song on Tina Turner, either. The reggae-style song, which features a repeated sample from Aretha Franklin's version of "Spanish Harlem", reached No. 53 on both the UK Singles Chart and the Billboard Hot 100.

Track listing 
 7" Single
"Tonight" – 3:43
"Tumble and Twirl" – 4:56

 12" Single
"Tonight (Vocal Dance Mix)" – 4:29
"Tumble and Twirl (Extended Dance Mix)" – 5:03
"Tonight (Dub Mix)" – 4:18

Personnel 
 David Bowie – vocals
 Tina Turner – vocals
 Carlos Alomar – guitar
 Carmine Rojas – bass guitar
 Omar Hakim – drums
 Guy St Onge – marimba

Production
 David Bowie – producer
 Derek Bramble – producer
 Hugh Padgham – producer

Chart performance

Tina Turner and David Bowie live version 

David Bowie would perform the song live with Tina Turner at the latter's 23 March 1985 concert at the National Exhibition Centre in Birmingham. This version was included on Turner's live album Tina Live in Europe three years later, and also released as a single in late 1988, then becoming a number-one hit in the Netherlands.

Charts and certifications

Weekly charts

Year-end charts

Certifications and sales

References 

 Pegg, Nicholas, The Complete David Bowie, Reynolds & Hearn Ltd, 2000,

External links 
 Official video

1977 songs
1984 singles
1988 singles
David Bowie songs
Tina Turner songs
Iggy Pop songs
Dutch Top 40 number-one singles
Songs written by David Bowie
Songs written by Iggy Pop
Song recordings produced by David Bowie
Song recordings produced by Hugh Padgham
Male–female vocal duets
Reggae songs